Nautan Assembly constituency is an assembly constituency in Paschim Champaran district in the Indian state of Bihar.

Overview
As per orders of Delimitation of Parliamentary and Assembly constituencies Order, 2008, 6. Nautan Assembly constituency is composed of the following: Bairiya and Nautan community development blocks.

Nautan Assembly constituency is part of 2. Paschim Champaran. It was earlier part of Bettiah.

Members of Legislative Assembly

Election results

2020

2015

2010

References

External links
 

Assembly constituencies of Bihar
Politics of West Champaran district